The 1989–90 WHL season was the 24th season for the Western Hockey League.  Fourteen teams completed a 72-game season.  The Kamloops Blazers won the President's Cup.

Regular season

Final standings

Scoring leaders
Note: GP = Games played; G = Goals; A = Assists; Pts = Points; PIM = Penalties in minutes

1990 WHL Playoffs

First round
Swift Current defeated Brandon 5–4 OT in sixth place tie-breaker game.
Lethbridge and Prince Albert earn byes to Division Semifinals.
Regina defeated Swift Current 3 games to 1.
Saskatoon defeated Medicine Hat 3 games to 0.

Division Semifinals
Lethbridge defeated Saskatoon 4 games to 3.
Prince Albert defeated Regina 4 games to 3.
Kamloops defeated Spokane 5 games to 1.
Seattle defeated Tri-City 5 games to 2.

Division Finals
Lethbridge defeated Prince Albert 4 games to 3.
Kamloops defeated Seattle 5 games to 1.

WHL Championship
Kamloops defeated Lethbridge 4 games to 1.

All-Star game

On January 26, the East division defeated the West division 9–6 at Kennewick, Washington before a crowd of 5,059.

WHL awards

All-Star Teams

See also
1990 Memorial Cup
1990 NHL Entry Draft
1989 in sports
1990 in sports

References
whl.ca
 2005–06 WHL Guide

Western Hockey League seasons
WHL
WHL